Vladimir "Vlada" Zečević (Serbian-Cyrillic: Владимир Влада Зечевић; 21 March 1903 (OS), in Loznica – 26 October 1970, in Belgrade) was a Serbian Orthodox priest and later a member of the League  of Communists of Yugoslavia and the Yugoslav Partisans during World War II who served as the first post-WW2 Minister of the Interior of Yugoslavia from 7 March 1945 to 2 February 1946.

Biography 
Zečević was born in Loznica, on 25 March 1903. He graduated from the University of Belgrade's Faculty of Theology. From 1927 to 1941 he served as a parish priest in Krupanj, whereupon he became invested in the political life, ardently supporting the opposition.

After the Invasion of Yugoslavia in 1941 by the Axis powers, Zečević voluntarily joined the Royal Yugoslav Army. He was, at first, affiliated with the Chetniks but, following the siege on Šabac, he defected to the Yugoslav Partisans together with lieutenant Ratko Martinović, alongside five hundred other Chetnik soldiers.

In November 1941, during the short-lived liberated territory in Western Serbia, known as Republic of Užice, he was a member of the newly established Main National Liberation Committee for Serbia responsible for Trade, supplies, forestry and mining. 

He joined the League of Communists of Yugoslavia in 1942 and went on to serve as a political commissar deputy of the Valjevo Partisan Unit, a member of the AVNOJ's Executive Board, a commissioner of the Denominational Department during the First AVNOJ Session and a commissioner of internal affairs during the World War II.

Having survived the war, Zečević served as Minister of the Interior of Yugoslavia from 1945 to 1946; as Minister of Construction, Transportation and Infrastructure of the SR Serbia from 1952 to 1953 and as president of the Yugoslav Parliament from 1954 to 1960.

Zečević died in Belgrade on 26 October 1970, where he was also buried.

Bibliography 
Zečević authored three books, all published in the 1960s, respectively titled An Encounter in the Dark (Belgrade, 1963), The More You Know (Belgrade, 1968) and Insurgency Growing (Zagreb, 1968).

References

Sources
  
Roberts, Walter. Tito, Mihailovic and the Allies 1941 - 1945. Duke Univ. Press, 1994.
Steinberg, S. H. The Statesman's Year-Book: Statistical and Historical Annual of the States of the World for the Year 1950. Macmillan, 1950

1903 births
1970 deaths
People from Loznica
League of Communists of Serbia politicians
Yugoslav Partisans members
Serbian people of World War II
Serbian communists
Central Committee of the League of Communists of Yugoslavia members
Serbian Orthodox clergy
Eastern Orthodox Christians from Serbia
Christian communists
Eastern Orthodox socialists
European Christian socialists